Bracey is a census-designated place (CDP) in Mecklenburg County, Virginia, United States. It is located next to South Hill, La Crosse, and Brodnax also in Mecklenburg County.  The CDP had an estimated population of 1,554 in 2010.

History
Bracey is located along a former railroad mainline. The Richmond, Petersburg and Carolina Railroad, passing through Bracey from Petersburg, Virginia to Ridgeway Junction (today Norlina, North Carolina), was completed in 1900, at which point it was merged into the Seaboard Air Line (SAL). The railroad constructed a depot for Bracey, which was still standing as of 2021. By 1914, the population of Bracey was estimate by the railroad to be somewhere around 200. The line (dubbed the "S-line" after later mergers) continued to operate until the 1980s, and today Bracey is along the abandoned portion of the CSX Norlina Subdivision.

Geography and climate
Bracey is located at  (36.599589, −78.143051). It lies 341 feet (104 m) above sea level.

Bracey lies in the Piedmont area of Virginia and has a humid sub-tropical climate generalized by hot, humid summers and cool to chilly winters. The average annual rainfall is 42.7 inches with winter-time snowfall averaging 3.5 inches.

Demographics
As of the census estimates of 2007, the population of the ZCTA (ZIP Code Tabulation Area) for 23919 was 1,981 people, an increase of 6.02% from the 2000 census.
As of July 1,2020 total population listed is 2539 (100%). Population in Households 2538 (100%). Population in Families 2038(80.3%). Population in Group 1(0.0%). Quarters 1.
Population Density 88

Lake Gaston 
Bracey is the closest access point to Lake Gaston from Interstate-85. Bracey is home to over 20 businesses and thrives off of visitors to the Lake. It is home to Americamps camping grounds and Poplar point Marina as well as multiple real estate agencies and two private golf clubs. The lake is popular for its fishing and water sports and is broken into four major quadrants. Bracey is the main town in the North West Quadrant.

Economy
Local industry breakdown by occupation is 44.13% sales and professional, 19.47% construction and maintenance, 15.36% production and transportation, 9.92% foodservice and associated services, 9.67% management and financial services, and 1.45% agriculture.

References

External links
 Bracey, Virginia online
 Bracey, VA Info

Census-designated places in Mecklenburg County, Virginia
Census-designated places in Virginia